USS Waxsaw was the name of two ships in the United States Navy.  The name is taken from a Native American tribe more commonly referred to as the Waxhaws.

  was a single-turreted, twin-screw monitor, was renamed Niobe late in her career.
 , a net laying ship, was commissioned in 1945.

United States Navy ship names